Sean Gagnon (born September 11, 1973) is a Canadian retired professional ice hockey defenceman who played in the National Hockey League for the Phoenix Coyotes and the Ottawa Senators between 1997 and 2001. He played a total of 12 regular season games (seven for Phoenix and five for Ottawa) scoring one assist and collecting 34 penalty minutes.

Playing career
Gagnon was undrafted and began his professional career in the ECHL with the Dayton Bombers and scored 61 points in 136 games. He also racked up a total of 665 penalty minutes in his two seasons with the Bombers. This was followed by a spell in the International Hockey League with the Fort Wayne Komets where he scored 7 goals and 14 points in 72 games with 457 penalty minutes. He finished his career in Germany, playing two seasons in the 2nd Bundesliga for the Lausitzer Füchse. He also had spells in Europe playing in Finland's SM-liiga for Jokerit in 1999 and a brief stint in the Russian Super League for HC Neftekhimik Nizhnekamsk, playing two games in 2003.

Career statistics

Regular season and playoffs

External links
 

1973 births
Living people
Canadian expatriate ice hockey players in Finland
Canadian expatriate ice hockey players in Russia
Canadian ice hockey defencemen
Dayton Bombers players
Flint Generals players
Fort Wayne Komets players
Grand Rapids Griffins players
Hartford Wolf Pack players
HC Neftekhimik Nizhnekamsk players
Ice hockey people from Ontario
Jokerit players
Ottawa 67's players
Ottawa Senators players
Phoenix Coyotes players
San Antonio Rampage players
Sault Ste. Marie Greyhounds players
Sportspeople from Sault Ste. Marie, Ontario
Springfield Falcons players
St. John's Maple Leafs players
Sudbury Wolves players
Undrafted National Hockey League players
Utah Grizzlies (AHL) players